The American Philosophical Quarterly (APQ) is a peer-reviewed academic journal covering philosophy. It was established in 1964 by Nicholas Rescher and is published quarterly by University of Illinois Press under license with North American Philosophical Publications.

Abstracting and indexing 
The journal is abstracted and indexed in:

Notable articles 

 "Causes and Conditions" (1965) - J. L. Mackie
 "Indicators and Quasi-indicators" (1967) - Hector-Neri Castañeda
 "Truth in fiction" (1978) - David Lewis
 "Supervenience and Nomological Incommensurables" (1978) - Jaegwon Kim
 "The Corporation as a Moral Person" (1979) - Peter A French
 "On Reasoning about Values" (1980) - Wilfred Sellars
 "From Exasperating Virtues to Civic Virtues" (1996) - Amélie Oksenberg Rorty
 "The Enforcement of Morality" (2000) - John Kekes

See also 
 List of philosophy journals

References

External links 
 
 

Philosophy journals
Publications established in 1964
University of Illinois Press academic journals
American philosophy
Contemporary philosophical literature
Quarterly journals
English-language journals